Abul Khair Litu (born 7 October 1950) is a Bangladeshi industrialist and entrepreneur. He is known for his involvement in the promotion of the country's culture, art, music, theatre and literature.

Early life and education 

Litu was born on 7 October 1950 in Dhaka, Bangladesh. He obtained a bachelor's degree in commerce from Dhaka University in 1972.

Career
He went on to help establish AB Bank, the country's first private banking institution, in association with Dubai Bank. Litu is currently the chairman of the Bengal Group, a business house with interests in jute, cable television, electronic media, real estate, hospitality, media and advertising etc.

Bengal Foundation 

Litu's interest in the art and culture of Bangladesh was sparked off by his uncle – Professor Abdur Razzaque, an eminent academic and social scientist. Professor Razzaque introduced Litu to some of Bangladesh's most well-known artists, including Shilpacharya Zainul Abedin. Litu's interaction with the artists whom he met through his uncle soon inspired him to start his own art collection. He bought his very first painting in 1970, when he was just 20 years old.

As part of his endeavour to promote and showcase Bangladeshi art on a larger platform, Litu set up the Bengal Foundation in 1986, of which he is still the chairperson. The Bengal Foundation is a registered private trust funded entirely by the Bengal Group. Over a span of twenty-five years since its inception, the Bengal Foundation has promoted a variety of visual and performing arts and crafts, with regular local, regional and international events. One such prominent event is a series of monthly music concerts where admission is free. The Bengal Foundation also holds demonstrations, seminars and workshops, and awards scholarships for those interested in studying Bangladeshi music.

Bengal Classical Music Festival 
Perhaps one of the most popular events organized by the Bengal Foundation is the Bengal Classical Music Festival. The Bengal Classical Music Festival is the world's largest classical music festival in terms of number of performers on a single stage, audience capacity and duration. The festival started its journey in 2012 and since then organized events every year with amazing success. Brilliant performers from all over the world like Abhijit Banerjee, Hariprasad Chaurasia, Kaivalya Kumar Gurav, Budhaditya Mukherjee, Pandit Ajoy Chakrabarty and many others have performed on this stage.

Bengal Foundation awards 

Litu has instituted a number of awards through the Bengal Foundation to encourage established as well as emerging Bangladeshi artists.

The Bengal Foundation Award, instituted in 1998, is awarded to an artist for commendable work in the National Art Exhibition organised by the Bangladesh Shilpakala Academy. The Master Craftsperson's award has been instituted in association with the National Crafts Council. It is the highest honour for praiseworthy work in the crafts field.

Art museums and galleries 

Litu converted one of his residences to establish the Bengal Gallery of Fine Arts in the year 2000. It is one of the earliest professionally run art galleries in Bangladesh, and is also the largest private one. Till date, the BGFA has showcased the work of over 250 artists and produced 35 documentary films. He has also unveiled plans to set up 'Art Lounges' in places where important policymakers and strategists convene. A part of his art collection is being used to decorate them. The first lounge is the Bengal Art Lounge in the Dhaka Club.

Litu also announced the building of the Bengal Museum of Contemporary Arts and Crafts, slated to be the largest private arts and crafts museum in South Asia. Construction work has begun at Savar, on the banks of the Bangshi River, on 40 bighas (45 acres) of land that he has donated for this purpose.

Bangladeshi theatre and publishing 

Litu has been a longtime sponsor of Bangladeshi theatre. The Development of Theatre program that he ran between 2001 and 2007 encouraged new performers with infrastructure development, training, workshops and theatre festivals across the country. The current theatre development program, which has been running since 2009, is aimed at marginalised communities such as Adivasis, transsexuals and Chars.

He has also founded a number of specialised publications to promote Bangladeshi art and culture.

Jamini – an English quarterly dedicated to the art of Bangladesh

Kali O Kalam – a monthly Bengali literary magazine. The Young Poet and Writer's award has been instituted by this publication to nurture emerging literary talent in Bangladesh.

Bengal Barota – a cultural events bulletin

Shilpa O Shilpi – a Bengali arts quarterly

Litu also gives greater exposure to traditional culture through his lifestyle glossies, Charbela Chardik and ICE Today, and ICE Business Times, a Bangladeshi business magazine.

TOTAL SPORTS and KHELADHULA – Two sports magazine, one in English and other in Bengali. Both were supposed to be periodic. And He started initiated funding this project through his other respected concern ICE MEDIA. Besides the print publications, he had the vision to launch two very dynamic only-sports-based website. Unfortunately, after two attempts, one in 2011 and other in 2017, the project was discontinued. He was criticised for the way the project was shut down in June 2017. The entire management was shut down without any prior notice. Journalists from other reputed media joined there with their own plans and visions. But they were suddenly jobless out of the blues. This incident put a dent to his reputation in and out of the industry he belongs.

Partnership with Skira Publications 

In 2011, Litu announced that he had entered into a partnership with Skira, an Italian publishing house, to bring out a special series of 40 volumes showcasing Bangladeshi art. The first four volumes are scheduled to be released by April 2012 and are monographs of photographer Shahidul Alam, painters Kazi Ghivasuddin, Safiuddin Ahmed and Zainul Abedin.

References 

1950 births
Living people
People from Dhaka
Bangladeshi businesspeople
University of Dhaka alumni